Aerial Ballet is the third studio album by American musician Harry Nilsson, released in July 1968.

Overview
Aerial Ballet was Nilsson's second album for RCA Victor, and was titled after the highwire circus act of his grandparents. It consists almost entirely of songs written by him, including "One", which later became a Number Five hit for Three Dog Night. The title of the album has been cited by Joey Kramer as the inspiration for Aerosmith's name and wings motif.

The most familiar track from Aerial Ballet is its one cover song, Fred Neil's "Everybody's Talkin. It was released as a single in North America in 1968, and reached the top forty in Canada—but initially flopped in the US.  However, the song was subsequently selected for use in the Oscar-winning film Midnight Cowboy and became one of Nilsson's biggest hits as a performer, hitting the US top ten in 1969. Another song, "Little Cowboy", later featured in The Courtship of Eddie's Father, was written by Nilsson's mother.

The original opening number for Aerial Ballet was "Daddy's Song", but this track was removed (apparently without Nilsson's awareness) after the first copies were issued, because The Monkees had recorded a cover version to be featured in their film Head, and had paid $35,000 for exclusive rights to the song. Recent reissues restore "Daddy's Song" (with the Monkees' contract long expired) to its rightful place in the lineup.

When Nilsson visited the Beatles in London during 1968, John Lennon played Nilsson "Revolution" and selections from the (then-upcoming) White Album, and Nilsson, in turn, played to Lennon (who had spent thirty-six hours listening to Nilsson's previous album, Pandemonium Shadow Show) a demo cut of this record.

The album was reissued in 1980 on Pickwick (ACL-7075). It had a different cover featuring a biplane in a field, with the pilot standing in the foreground smoking a cigarette in a holder.  It had a printed stamp in the upper right corner announcing "Grammy Award Winner, Best Contemporary Male Vocalist, Everybody's Talkin.  The song order was different, and both "Daddy's Song" and "Bath" were missing.

Track listing 

excluded from initial British copies

Personnel 
Credits per Allmusic:

 Harry Nilsson – vocals
 Dennis Budimir – guitar
 Al Casey – guitar
 Michael Melvoin – harpsichord, organ, piano
 Larry Knechtel – bass, piano
 Lyle Ritz – bass
 Jim Gordon – drums
 Milt Holland – bells, mallets, tabla, timpani
 Carroll Lewis – trumpet, flugelhorn
 Ollie Mitchell – trumpet
 Anthony Terran – trumpet, flugelhorn
 Robert Enevoldsen – baritone horn, trombone
 Dick Hyde – baritone horn, bass trombone
 Robert Knight – baritone horn, bass trombone
 Richard Taylor "Dick" Nash – baritone horn, trombone
 George Roberts – baritone horn
 David Duke – French horn, tuba
 James R. Horn – flute
 Bob Hardaway – woodwinds
 Plas Johnson – woodwinds
 John Lowe – woodwinds
 John Rotella – woodwinds
 Leonard Atkins – violin
 Arnold Belnick – violin
 James Getzoff – violin
 Alfred Lustgarten – violin
 Leonard Malarsky – violin
 Wilbert Nuttycombe – violin
 Jerome Reisler – violin
 Charlotte Soy – violin
 Darrel Terwilliger – violin
 William Weiss – violin
 Tibor Zelig – violin
 Jesse Ehrlich – cello
 Ray Kelly – cello
 Jacqueline Lustgarten – cello

Production and technical personnel
 George Tipton – arrangements
 Rick Jarrard – producer
 Brian Christian – engineer
 Grover Helsley – engineer
 Allen Zentz – engineer
 Hank McGill – engineer
 Pat Ieraci – technician
 Dick Hendler – artwork, cover illustration

References

External links 
Aerial Ballet at The Harry Nilsson Web Pages

Harry Nilsson albums
1968 albums
RCA Records albums
Albums produced by Rick Jarrard
Albums arranged by George Tipton